Marie Charles Denis Paul Leduc (January 28, 1889 – December 17, 1971) was an Ontario barrister, solicitor and political figure. He represented Ottawa East in the Legislative Assembly of Ontario as a Liberal member from 1934 to 1940.

He was born in Montreal, the son of Napoléon Leduc, and was educated there and at the Université Laval. In 1917, he married Gabrielle Belcourt, who was the daughter of Napoléon Belcourt. Leduc served as Minister of Mines in the provincial cabinet from 1934 to 1940. He died at an Ottawa hospital in 1971.

References 

 Canadian Parliamentary Guide, 1937, AL Normandin

External links 

1889 births
1971 deaths
Ontario Liberal Party MPPs
Members of the Executive Council of Ontario
Franco-Ontarian people
Politicians from Montreal
Université Laval alumni